Fife North East may mean or refer to:

 North East Fife (UK Parliament constituency)
 Fife North East (Scottish Parliament constituency)